Eriogonum douglasii is a species of wild buckwheat known by the common name Douglas' buckwheat. It is native to the western United States, including the Pacific Northwest and part of the Great Basin.

This plant forms a mat of hairy herbage around a caudex. There are rosettes of lance-shaped to oval leaves with blades 0.4 to nearly 2 centimeters long. The leaves are feltlike, covered in woolly hairs. The inflorescence arises on a solid, erect flowering stem up to 15 centimeters tall with a whorl of bracts midway up. It is a headlike cluster of cream, yellowish, or rose-pink flowers with protruding stamens.

This plant grows in grassland, sagebrush, woodland, and pine forest habitat.

There are three varieties of this species, including vars. douglasii and meridionale. The rare var. elkoense (Sunflower Flat wild buckwheat) is endemic to Elko County, Nevada.

References

External links
CalPhotos Photo Gallery

douglasii
Plants described in 1856
Flora of the Western United States